Severe Tropical Storm Kammuri, known in the Philippines as Tropical Storm Julian, was a storm which made landfall on south China in August 2008, having a maximum wind speed of . The name Kammuri was submitted to the World Meteorological Organisation's Typhoon Committee by Japan and is Japanese for the Corona Borealis constellation of stars.

Severe Tropical Storm Kammuri was the ninth tropical cyclone to occur in the Western North Pacific in 2008, recognised by the Japan Meteorological Agency operationally. The Joint Typhoon Warning Center also recognised Kammuri as the tenth tropical cyclone in the 2008 Pacific typhoon season. The Philippine Atmospheric, Geophysical and Astronomical Services Administration (PAGASA), recognised Julian as the 10th tropical cyclone, of the 2008 Pacific typhoon season.

Kammuri developed as a tropical depression on August 4 to the north of the island of Luzon. With the depression then intensifying into a Tropical storm the next day and was assigned the name Kammuri by the Regional Specialized Meteorological Center (RSMC) Tokyo. It then made landfall on China in the western Guangdong province this landfall made Kammuri weaken first into a Tropical Storm that evening with the JTWC then issuing their last advisory on Kammuri. Kammuri then emerged into the Gulf of Tonkin the next day, but made a second landfall over China but this time in the Guangxi province of China. After Kammuri made landfall the JMA issued its final advisory on Kammuri.

Heavy rains from Kammuri in Vietnam led to the loss of at least 100 lives and destroyed over 300 homes while damaging over 3,500 others.

Meteorological history

On August 3, PAGASA identified a tropical disturbance which was located in the South China Sea to the north of Luzon island in the Philippines and was later classified as Tropical Depression Julian. Later that day the Japan Meteorological Agency (JMA) designated Julian as a minor tropical depression and initiated advisories on the tropical depression.

Early the next day the JMA started to issue full advisories on the tropical depression. The Joint Typhoon Warning Center (JTWC) then started to issue warnings on the tropical depression later that day with them designating it as Tropical Depression 10W. Furthermore, later that day both PAGASA and the JTWC upgraded the tropical depression to a tropical storm.

On August 5, the JMA upgraded the depression to a tropical storm and named it Kammuri, whilst PAGASA released their final advisory on Tropical Storm Kammuri (Julian) later that day as it moved out of their Area of Responsibility and headed towards mainland China. The Hong Kong Observatory (HKO) then upgraded Kammuri to a severe tropical storm late on August 5, with the JMA doing the same early the next morning.

However, Kammuri started to weaken after making landfall along the south coast of China in the Western Guangdong Province at about 12pm UTC on August 6. After Kammuri had made landfall the JMA downgraded Kammuri to a tropical storm, whilst the JTWC issued their final advisory later that day on Tropical Storm Kammuri. Early the next day Tropical Storm Kammuri emerged into the Gulf of Tonkin, however later that day Kammuri made landfall again in the Guangxi province of China. After making landfall for the second time on August 7 Kammuri weakened to a tropical depression as the JMA issued its final advisory. However the JMA continued to monitor the depression in their WWJP25 warnings until early on August 8.

Preparations

Philippines
As Tropical Depression Julian formed to the north of the Philippines On August 3, PAGASA issued Storm Signal #1, a warning for winds of 30–60 km/h (19–37 mph), for parts of Luzon. The parts of Luzon that were under Public Storm Signal #1 included the Batanes Group of Islands, Babuyan Group of Islands, Calayan Group of Islands, northern Cagayan, Apayao, Ilocos Norte, Ilocos Sur, Abra and La Union. Early on the afternoon of August 4 PAGASA lowered Storm Signal #1 for all regions of Luzon except for Ilocos Norte, Ilocos Sur, Abra, La Union. Early the next morning they lowered the rest of the Public Warning Signals as they released their final advisory on Julian.

China

Macau
Late on August 5, the weather bureau of Macau hoisted the Gale or Storm Signal No.8, whilst earlier in the day they had hoisted Strong Wind Signal No.3. The weather bureau of Macau then replaced signal No.8 with signal No.3 as the storm moved away from Macau.

Hong Kong
Early on August 4, the Hong Kong Observatory (HKO) started to issue public warnings on a tropical depression which was located within  of Hong Kong. Within their first advisory on Kammuri the HKO raised the Standby Signal No.1 for Hong Kong Late the next day the HKO hoisted the Strong Wind Signal No.3 which meant that winds above  were expected to be blowing in Hong Kong within 12 hours. However, during the morning of August 6 the HKO issued the Northeast Gale or Storm Signal No.8. Later that day, the HKO hoisted the Southeast Gale or Storm Signal No.8, which was replacing the 8NE Warning However nine hours later the HKO removed the 8SE warning and downgraded it to Signal No.3 later that day, which was in force for 11 hours before it was downgraded to Signal 1 which was in force for 3 hours before all signals were cancelled.

Impact

Philippines
Tropical Storm Julian (Kammuri) did not make landfall in the Philippines. However, it enhanced the southwest monsoon which continued to bring heavy rain to the Philippines. However, no damage was reported in the Philippines

China
Kammuri affected athletes training for the Olympics which were about to be held within China and Hong Kong.

Macau
Kammuri caused ferry services between Macau and Guangdong Province to close down. Bus services were cancelled with most plane flights cancelled or severely delayed

Hong Kong
The impact of Tropical Storm Kammuri was felt strongly in Hong Kong, shortly before its landfall in china, with at least 37 people being injured. The public transport service were halted or reduced and as significant cross winds affected the Hong Kong International Airport the Airport Authority had to cancel or delay over 380 flights with five others diverted to other airports. There were also over 40 reports of fallen trees and collapsed scaffoldings in various districts of Hong Kong. There was a report of a landslide in Tai Hang. At least 10 people had to be evacuated in Kwun Tong as the zinc roof of their hut was blown away.

Vietnam
When Tropical Storm Kammuri hit Vietnam at least 127 people have been confirmed as dead and 34 others are missing after Kammuri caused flash floods and landslides. Entire towns and villages were cut off. Hundreds of tourists were also landlocked in Sa Pa and in Lào Cai.

See also

2008 Pacific typhoon season
Other tropical cyclones named Kammuri
 Timeline of the 2008 Pacific typhoon season

References

External links

JMA General Information of Severe Tropical Storm Kammuri (0809) from Digital Typhoon
JMA Best Track Data of Severe Tropical Storm Kammuri (0809) 
JMA Best Track Data (Graphics) of Severe Tropical Storm Kammuri (0809)
JMA Best Track Data (Text)
JTWC Best Track Data of Tropical Storm 10W (Kammuri)
10W.KAMMURI from the U.S. Naval Research Laboratory
 Tropical Storm Kammuri Hammers South China's Akoya Pearl Industry

2008 Pacific typhoon season
Typhoons in China
Typhoons in Vietnam
Tropical Storm Kammuri
J
J
Tropical Storm Kammuri
Western Pacific severe tropical storms
Typhoons in Hong Kong
Kammuri